Charles B. Perrow (February 9, 1925 – November 12, 2019) was an emeritus professor of sociology at Yale University and visiting professor at Stanford University. He authored several books and many articles on organizations, and was primarily concerned with the impact of large organizations on society.

Academic appointments
After attending the University of Washington, Black Mountain College in North Carolina, and UC Berkeley, he received his PhD in sociology from Berkeley in 1960.  He has held appointments at the universities of Michigan, Pittsburgh, Wisconsin, SUNY Stony Brook, and Yale, where he became emeritus in 2000.  Since 2004 he has been a visiting professor at the Center for International Security and Cooperation at Stanford, in the winter and spring quarters.

He served as the Vice President of the Eastern Sociological Society. He was also a Fellow of the Center for Advanced Study in the Behavioral Sciences and the American Academy for the Advancement of Science. Perrow served as a Resident Scholar for the Russell Sage Foundation at the Shelly Cullom Davis Center for Historical Studies at Princeton University. Perrow was a visitor at the Institute for Advanced Study in Princeton, New Jersey. Perrow was a member of the Committee on Human Factors at the National Academy of Sciences of the Sociology Panel for the National Science Foundation.

Notable works
Perhaps his most widely cited work is Complex Organizations: A Critical Essay, first published in 1972.

Perrow is also the author of the book Normal Accidents: Living With High Risk Technologies which explains his theory of normal accidents; catastrophic accidents that are inevitable in tightly coupled and complex systems. His theory predicts that failures will occur in multiple and unforeseen ways that are virtually impossible to predict.

Selected publications
Books

 Perrow, Charles (2011, New Edition) (2007). The Next Catastrophe: Reducing Our Vulnerabilities to Natural, Industrial, and Terrorist Disasters. Princeton, NJ: Princeton University Press.
 Perrow, Charles (2002). Organizing America: Wealth, Power and the Origins of American Capitalism. Princeton, NJ: Princeton University Press.
 Perrow, Charles and Mauro F. Guillén (1990). The AIDS Disaster: The Failure of Organizations in New York and the Nation. New Haven, CT: Yale University Press.
 Perrow, Charles (1984). Normal Accidents: Living With High Risk Technologies. (Revised edition, 1999). Princeton, NJ: Princeton University Press.
 Perrow, Charles (1972). Complex Organizations: A Critical Essay. (Third edition, 1986). McGraw-Hill Publishers.
 Perrow, Charles (1972). The Radical Attack on Business. Harcourt Brace Jovanovich.
 Perrow, Charles (1970). Organizational Analysis: A Sociological View. Tavistock Press.

Chapters

 Charles Perrow (2010). “Organizations and Global Warming,” Constance Lever-Tracy, ed., Routledge Handbook of Climate Change and Society. 2010, New York City: Routledge. 59–77
 Charles Perrow (2010). The Meltdown Was Not an Accident, in Michael Lounsbury, Paul M. Hirsch (ed.) Markets on Trial: The Economic Sociology of the U.S. Financial Crisis: Part A (Research in the Sociology of Organizations, Volume 30), Emerald Group Publishing Limited, pp. 309–330

Articles and Papers

 Perrow, Charles (2013). Nuclear Denial: From Hiroshima to Fukushima. Bulletin of the Atomic Scientists, Volume 69 Issue 5.
 Perrow, Charles (2012). Getting to Catastrophe: Concentrations, Complexity and Coupling. The Montréal Review.
 Perrow, Charles (2011). Fukushima and the Inevitability of Accidents. Bulletin of the Atomic Scientists.
 Perrow, Charles (2011). Technology Can Nudge Climate Change Politics. Bloomberg News.
 Perrow, Charles (2011). Fukushima, risk, and probability: Expect the unexpected. Bulletin of the Atomic Scientists.
 Perrow, Charles (2010). Giddens and the Developing Nations Examine Global Warming. Review Essay, Contemporary Sociology, 2010, v 39, no 4, 411–416.
 Perrow, Charles (2009). "Modeling firms in the global economy." Theory and Society, 2009, v 38:3, May, 217–243.
 Perrow, Charles (2008). Software Failures, Security, and Cyberattacks. Paper.
 Perrow, Charles (2008). "Disasters Evermore? Reducing our Vulnerabilities to Natural, Industrial, and Terrorist Disasters," Social Research 75:3 Fall, 2008, 1–20.
 Perrow, Charles (2008). "Complexity, Catastrophe, and Modularity," Sociological Inquiry 78:2, May 2008 162-73
 Perrow, Charles (2008). "Conservative Radicalism," Organization 15:6 2008 915–921

See also
High reliability organization
Megaprojects and Risk
Brittle Power

References

External links

Homepage at Yale
Curriculum Vitae (PDF)
 Perrow, Charles. Getting to Catastrophe: Concentrations, Complexity and Coupling (The Montreal Review, December 2012)
Yale Sociology Department Regrets the Loss of Charles Perrow
New Haven Register Obituary
New Haven Independent Obituary

University of Pittsburgh faculty
American sociologists
Environmental sociologists
1925 births
University of Washington alumni
Black Mountain College alumni
University of California, Berkeley alumni
People associated with nuclear power
University of Michigan faculty
2019 deaths
20th-century social scientists
21st-century social scientists